Old Parliament House or Old Parliament Building may refer to:

Old Parliament Building
Old Parliament Building, Colombo, Sri Lanka
Old Parliament Building (Quebec), Canada

Old Parliament House
Old Parliament House, Athens, Greece
Old Parliament House, Canberra, Australia
Old Parliament House, Singapore, now known as The Arts House 
Old Parliament House, Sofia, Bulgaria
Old Parliament House, Stockholm, Sweden
The first Parliament House, Adelaide was known as Old Parliament House between the 1970s and 1995

See also
 Owain Glyndŵr's Parliament House, Machynlleth, Wales
 Parliament House (disambiguation)